Erebia rossii, the Arctic alpine or Ross's alpine, is a member of the subfamily Satyrinae of the family Nymphalidae. It is found in Arctic North America and northern Eurasia.

Description
The wingspan is 31–44 mm. The dorsal wings are blackish brown. The forewing in the male has two black eyespots with white pupils sometimes surrounded by one or two orange rings. The male's hindwing has no spots or a partial row of very small spots. The female has two large eyespots and may have smaller spots on both wings. The ventral hindwings have greyish median bands with jagged borders.

Subspecies
Listed alphabetically:
E. r. erda Sheljuzhko, 1924 (Sajan mountains)
E. r. ero Bremer, 1861 (eastern Siberia, Dzhugdzhur Mountains)
E. r. gabrieli dos Passos, 1949 (Alaska)
E. r. kuskoquima Holland, 1931 (Kuskoquim Valley)
E. r. ornata Leussler, 1935 (Manitoba)
E. r. subarctica Korshunov, 1996 (mountains of Yakutia and Chukotka)

Life cycle
The food plants of the larvae are various grasses, including Carex species.

References

Erebia
Insects of the Arctic
Butterflies of North America
Butterflies of Europe
Butterflies of Asia
Butterflies described in 1835